Xingye County is a county in the southeast of Guangxi, China. It is under the administration of the prefecture-level city of Yulin.

Tourism
Longquan Rock Scenic Area
Yanshan Lake Scenic Area
Shiyi Tower

Special local products
Xingye Tribute Pothos
Cheng Huang Suanliao

External links
Xingye Government website

Counties of Guangxi
Yulin, Guangxi